John David Howell (born 10 April 1936) is a former British long jumper.

Athletics career
Howell was born in London, England. He first competed internationally at the 1960 Summer Olympics in Rome, Italy. Representing Great Britain, he finished in 27th place in the qualifying round of the long jump event with a jump of 7.19 metres.

References

1936 births
Living people
Athletes from London
English male long jumpers
Olympic athletes of Great Britain
Commonwealth Games competitors for England
Athletes (track and field) at the 1960 Summer Olympics
Athletes (track and field) at the 1962 British Empire and Commonwealth Games